Love Is Blue is a 1969 album by The Dells.

Track listing

Side 1
"I Can Sing a Rainbow / Love Is Blue"
"Oh, What a Night"
"Dock of the Bay"
"A Little Understanding"
"One Mint Julep"

Side 2
"A Whiter Shade of Pale"
"A Summer Place"
"The Glory of Love"
"Honey"
"Wichita Lineman"/"By the Time I Get to Phoenix"

Recording
The album was recorded at Ter Mar Studio, Chicago, in June 1969 in CONCEPT 12.

Personnel
Charles Stepney – Arranger
Bobby Miller – Producer
Stu Black – Engineer
Lee Russo – cover photo
Warren Linn – Liner illustration
Randy Harter – Art Direction

References

External links
 Marv Goldberg's article on The Dells
 The Dells Allmusic entry 
 The Dells biography and updates at Soul Tracks
 'The Dells' Vocal Group Hall of Fame Page

1969 albums
The Dells albums
Cadet Records albums
Albums arranged by Charles Stepney